Crenides or Krenides, or Cranides or Kranides (Κρανίδες), was a town on the Pontic coast of Bithynia, according to Arrian 60 stadia east of Sandaraca; according to Marcian only 20 stadia. It was between Heraclea and the mouth of the Billaeus.

The site of Crenides is near the modern Kilimli, Turkey.

References

Populated places in Bithynia
Former populated places in Turkey
[[Category:History of Zonguldak Province